Chitra Sarwara (Hindi: चित्रा सरवारा; born 18 March 1975) is an Indian politician of the Aam Aadmi Party. On 13 June 2013, she was elected as a councillor of the Ambala Municipal Corporation, Haryana.

Sarwara was the National General Secretary of Social Media for the All India Mahila Congress. She was also the Senior Vice President, Spokesperson, and Coordinator for Observers and Co-observers of the Haryana Pradesh Mahila Congress Committee and the National General Secretary of Organization and Treasurer for the Haryana Democratic Front.

In 2019, Sarwara ran for the Vidhan Sabha as an independent to represent Ambala Cantt, Haryana, and came in second.

Personal life

Chitra Sarwara was born in Ambala Cantt, Haryana on 18 March 1975. Her father, Nirmal Singh, is also a member of the Aam Aadmi Party. Previously, he was a member of Indian National Congress and a four times elected representative of Naggal Constituency, Haryana. He was the founder of the Haryana Democratic Front. He was the Minister of Animal Husbandry and was later the Minister of Revenue. She has 3 siblings.

She is married to Digvijay Singh Chahal, and the couple has two children. Their son was born with biliary atresia, a rare liver disorder. In December 2016, when he was 8 months old, Sarwara donated part of her liver to her child.

Education
Sarwara attended the Convent of Jesus and Mary, Ambala and Bhartiya Public School in  Ambala Cantt. 

In 1994, she graduated from the Motilal Nehru School of Sports. She was a National Volleyball player, winning many state and national titles with her school team. In 1993, Sarwara represented Haryana in the National School Volleyball Championship in Purnia, Bihar, which was won by the Haryana team. In 1994, she represented India against Sri Lanka. She attended India Camp in Bangalore

In 2000, Sarwara graduated from the National Institute of Design, Ahmedabad as an industrial designer specializing in furniture design.

Career

Sarwara has worked for Tesseract Design and Idiom Design and Consulting in Bangalore Banglore. In Delhi, she worked as an independent design consultant and was the Design Head of the Delhi office of Idiom Design and Consulting.

As a member of Idiom Design and Consulting, she was the design manager for  the Image and Look program for the 2010 Commonwealth Games. The program involved the development of the branding and logo of the games.

Political career

In 2013, Sarwara was elected as an independent municipal corporator from Ambala Cantt, a newly formed municipal corporation. In March 2015, she joined the Haryana Pradesh Mahila Congress Committee as a spokesperson under the leadership of the dynamic State President Smt. Sumitra Chauhan and as a State Coordinator for Observers & Co-observers of Rohtak-Karnal Division (Minus Bhiwani and Kaithal). 

In May 2015, she organised a massive women's symposium on Martyr's Day, Sh Rajiv Gandhi's death anniversary. "Rajiv Gandhi- Ek Vyaktitav, Ek Soch" was attended by senior state INC leadership and women from Ambala.

In 2016, she was appointed as the Senior Vice President of the Haryana Pradesh Mahila Congress Committee.

In 2017, during the tenure of All India Mahila Congress (AIMC) President Smt. Shobha Oza, Sarwara was appointed as Social Media Incharge. She started the first concerted effort by the organisation to build its online presence. On 13 Dec 2017, the website of the All India Mahila Congress was launched by Indian National Congress President Sh. Rahul Gandhi during The Way Ahead, a Mahila Congress workshop organised by AIMC president Sushmita Dev. In 2017, the Mahila Congress started a signature campaign, #WomenFor33. More than 10,000 signatures were collected in Ambala for this campaign. Sarwara was part of AIMC delegation led by Sushmita Dev that submitted the signatures collected to the president of India, Sh. Ram Nath Kovind, on 14 October 2017.

In March 2018, she was appointed as Secretary of the All India Mahila Congress. Sarwara continued the long-standing project of developing an individual identity and logo for the Mahila Congress. On 7 August 2018, the Mahila Congress logo and flag  was launched by INC President Sh. Rahul Gandhi during the Mahila Adhikaar Sammelan. Sarwara was appointed as General Secretary of the All India Mahila Congress on 30 Aug 2018.

On 30 September 2018, Sarwara organised women's programs in Ambala as a part of Mahila Adhikaar Yatra.

In October 2019, after being denied the ticket by the Indian National Congress, Sarwara ran as an independent candidate from Ambala Cantt constituency. She received more than 44thousand votes, while the Indian National Congress candidate only received 8thousand votes.

In December 2019, Sarwara was appointed as National Treasurer for the Haryana Democratic Front. In October 2020, she was appointed as National General Secretary and Office Incharge for the Haryana Democratic Front. On 10 June 2022, Sarwara was appointed as one of the star campaigners for the Municipal Council & Municipal Committee election, which was held on 19 June 2022 across 46 cities of Haryana. She was appointed as the Incharge of North Zone for the Aam Aadmi Party in Haryana on 22 June 2022. The North Zone consists of 6 Districts - Panchkula, Ambala, Yamunanagar, Kurukshetra, Kaithal, and Karnal.

Protests

 February 2015, took part in a Kisaan Andolan called by Rahul Gandhi against land acquisition bill changes proposed by BJP government.
 March 2015, took part in a candle march protest 'Meri Beti Mera Gaurav' against female foeticide organised by Danik Bhaskar. 
 April 2015, protested in Chandigarh against the misgovernance of Haryana government.
 June 2015, took part in a protest against 1 year of Narendra Modi government in Delhi. 
 September 2016, led a women's protest in Ambala against the price rise of LPG, petrol and diesel.
 March 2017, took part in protest organised by Ambala Congress against false promise of BJP government to bring back Black Money. 
 14 May 2017, took part in protest against BJP government in Chandigarh for increase in crimes against women in Haryana.
 23 June 2017, protest organised in Ambala with small scale business owners against implementation of the  Goods and Services Tax.
 July 2017, protest against no legal action against the son of Subhash Barala, the BJP Haryana chief, accused of stalking a girl.
 25 July 2017, joined a sansad gherao protest on completion 3 years of central government.
 6 August 2017, organized a protest march in Ambala Cantt along with the Mahila Congress unit of Ambala against no arrests in the stalking case of the son of BJP Haryana chief.
 August 2017, protested outside house of Ambala Lok Sabha MP Rattan Lal Kataria, against his sexist comments on INC women leader Selja Kumari.
 8 November 2017, protested on anniversary of 2016 Indian banknote demonetisation
 14 December 2017, protested against election commission.
 19 December 2017, protest outside Municipal Cooperation against lack of development in Ambala.
 9 December 2017, participated in a protest organised by citizens to get justice for a 5-year girl raped and brutally murdered in Boh Village, Ambala Cantt.
 17 January 2018, protested in Chandigarh against Manohar Lal Khattar government on the various rape cases in Haryana.
 17 February 2018, joined a protest against Haryana government organized by Anganwadi workers.
 4 March 2018, participated in a fast for peace and harmony.
 8 March 2018, protested outside parliament demanding passage of #WomenFor33 Bill.
 15 March 2018, protested in Ambala to demand action against nephew of the minister for Health & Sport of Haryana, who is accused of fraud.
 21 March 2018, participated in a candle march in Ambala Cantt against the central government failing to bring back 39 Indians from Iraq.
 28 March 2018, Jan Aakrosh Rally. 
 4 April 2018, participated in Save Democracy Day. 
 April 2018, protested outside Divisional Railway Manager office against the delay in railway over bridge project.
 16 May 2018, protested against Haryana government decision of Corporation breach along with INC Ambala team.
 29 May 2018, Vishwasghat Diwas. 
 August 2018, Mahila Aakrosh Rally
 10 September 2018, organized a protest with Ambala Congress team against price rise of LPG, petrol, and diesel.
 September 2018, Bharat Band agitation, protest against Central Bureau of Investigation working as a puppet of Narendra Modi government.
 4 February 2019, HPMC protest at Chandigarh against accused who said inappropriate comments regarding Smt. Priyanka Gandhi.
 16 February 2019, lead a Candle march at Ambala Cantt for the Martyrs of Pulwama Attack.
 March 2019, Kala Diwas.
 Aug 2020, led a protest in Ambala Cantt for the fuel price rise.
 Aug 2020, led a protest against three farm laws at village Mandour, Ambala Cantt.
 Sep 2020, led a protest in Ambala City for the fuel price hike.
 Oct 2020, led a huge protest against three farm laws at Deputy Commissioner office, Ambala City.
 March 2022, led a protest against corruption in construction work at Municipal Corporation, Ambala City.
 April 2022, led a protest of corruption in construction of International Football Stadium, Ambala Cantt. This was Sarwara's first protest after joining the Aam Aadmi Party.

Organizations

The Light Within
Sarwara launched The Light Within (TLW)as an informal professional and social networking platform for women in Ambala. The goal was to get women from diverse fields to work together and better their lives and society. Under TLW, she organised preparatory workshops in all Ambala Government Senior Secondary Schools to help students prepare for exams. Additionally, the organisation organised workshops in collaboration with NGOs, gynecologist and social workers on menstrual hygiene for distributing free sanitary napkins amongst girls from financially challenged backgrounds.

The Light Within would become Nari Shakti and have a wider base and more widespread activities.

iHELP - Welfare Information Helpline
 - Welfare Information Helpline was founded in 2013 in collaboration with Team Suraksha and youth. It is a free social welfare information helpline, where anyone can call and receive details of various social welfare schemes and information on forms, procedures, and offices provided by the government of Haryana.  grew to include  camps where teams led by Sarwara would visit an area, and complete free forms for welfare. The camps would have printers for scanning documents and stamps for signing. Additionally, there mass form verification and filling camps for those who needed to apply for any government program.

Social activities

 In July 2014, an INC Ambala team led by Sarwara organised a Blood Donation Camp to honour the Kargil Martryrs. The event collected over 200 Bags of blood and Smt. Pratibha Singh, widow of Kargil Martyr Vinay Choudhary, graced the event as the Chief Guest and Indian Army Medical team came to collect Blood donations themselves too.
 On 20 Aug 2017, Sarwara helped private hospital to organize an eye checkup camp in Village Machhonda.
 In Aug 2018, organized a flood relief Camp for Kerala. The two day donation camp saw Ambala turn out in massive numbers to participate.
 In 2018, Sarwara organised various camps in Ambala Cantt to educate women on menstrual hygiene.
 On Yoga Day 2019, Chitra along with Poonam Sangwan organised a yoga camp in  Village Shahpur of Ambala Cantt.

Positions held
 July 2013-July 2018: Elected municipal corporator, Ambala Municipal Corporation, Haryana.
 2014: Appointed Member District level Vigilance Committee for PDS and Chairman Social welfare and Pensions ad hoc Committee.
 2015: Appointed State Coordinator for Observers and Co-observers & Spokesperson, Haryana Pradesh Mahila Congress Committee.
 2015: Appointed Incharge of Karnal and Rohtak Divisions (minus Kaithal and Bhiwani) in Haryana Pradesh Mahila Congress Committee.
 2016: Appointed Senior Vice President, Haryana Pradesh Mahila Congress Committee.
 2017: Appointed Incharge, Social Media, All India Mahila Congress. 
 Mar 2018: Appointed Secretary, All India Mahila Congress, Incharge Social Media.
 Aug 2018: Appointed General Secretary, All India Mahila Congress, Incharge Social Media.
 December 2019: Appointed National Treasurer, Haryana Democratic Front.
 Oct 2020: Appointed National General Secretary and Office Incharge, Haryana Democratic Front.
 April 2022: joined Aam Aadmi Party under the aegis of Sh. Arvind Kejriwal.
 June 2022: appointed as one of the star campaigners for the Municipal Council & Municipal Committee election held on 19 June 2022 across 46 cities of Haryana.
 June 2022: appointed as the Incharge of North Zone for Aam Aadmi Party Haryana.

References 

Living people
Indian National Congress organisations
Women's wings of political parties in India
All India Mahila Congress
Indian National Congress
Indian political party founders
Aam Aadmi Party politicians
1975 births
People from Haryana